Andrew Mark Lloyd (born 9 April 1981) is a Welsh International rugby union player. Currently, he plays for the Ospreys region in the Guinness PRO14. He can play back row or 2nd row.

His career has been blighted by injuries that have prevented him from adding to his solitary Welsh cap, which he won on the Welsh tour to Japan in 2001.

External links
Ospreys profile

1981 births
Living people
Ospreys (rugby union) players
Wales international rugby union players
Welsh rugby union players